The 2011–12 Tercera División was the fourth tier of football in Spain. Play started on 19 August 2011 and the season ended on 24 June 2012 with the promotion play-off finals.

Overview
There were 363 clubs competing in  Tercera División (Third division) in the 2011–12 season, divided into 18 regional groups, accommodating between 19 and 22 clubs.

The following clubs finished as champions of their respective groups

The 18 group champion clubs participated in the Group winners promotion play-off and the losers from these 9 play-off ties then proceeded to the Non-champions promotion play-off with clubs finishing second third and fourth.

League standings

Group 1 - Galicia

Group 2 - Asturias

Group 3 - Cantabria

Group 4 - Basque Country

Group 5 - Catalonia

Group 6 - Valencian Community

Group 7 - Community of Madrid

Group 8 - Castilla and León

Group 9 - Eastern Andalusia and Melilla

Group 10 - Western Andalusia and Ceuta

Group 11 - Balearic Islands

Group 12 - Canary Islands

Group 13 - Region of Murcia

Group 14 - Extremadura

Group 15 - Navarra

Group 16 - La Rioja

Group 17 - Aragón

Group 18 - Castilla-La Mancha

Promotion play-offs

Group winners promotion play-off

Non-champions promotion play-off

Notes

External links
 Real Federación Española de Fútbol
AREFE Regional
Lapreferente.com

 
Tercera División seasons
4
Spanish